Conrad Joseph Logan (born 18 April 1986) is an Irish professional footballer who plays as a goalkeeper for Anstey Nomads.

Logan joined the Leicester City academy in 2001, making his professional debut in 2005. He largely served Leicester as a backup goalkeeper, playing for several other clubs on loan. During a loan spell at Stockport County, Logan helped the club win the 2008 Football League Two play-off Final. At the time of his release in 2015, he was the longest-serving player in Leicester's squad.

After spending over a year out of the game, mainly due to injury, Logan signed for Scottish club Hibernian in March 2016. In his debut appearance for the club he made two saves in a penalty shoot-out earning them a place in the 2016 Scottish Cup Final, which they went on to win.

Career

Leicester City

Born in Letterkenny, County Donegal, he began his career in 2001 in the youth system at Leicester City. He had two loan spells at Boston United during the 2005–06 season.

Logan, who made his senior debut for Leicester in a 2–0 League Cup win over Macclesfield Town on 22 August 2006. After a series of poor displays from first-choice keeper Paul Henderson at the start of the 2006–07 season, Logan made his league debut in a 0–0 draw against Colchester United on 23 September. He was dropped from the first-team squad after conceding four goals against Sheffield Wednesday on 2 December 2006. Nonetheless, he signed a new three-year contract on 21 December. When Nigel Worthington was appointed caretaker manager, Logan regained his place in a 2–1 defeat to Norwich City on 14 April 2007. He played in the club's last five league games of the season, earning two clean sheets helping Leicester avoid relegation.

Stockport County (loan)
On 6 August 2007, Logan was made available for loan for the forthcoming season, and he signed a season-long loan with Stockport County on 9 August. In the 2007–08 season, Logan played 38 games for Stockport and helped the team to a League Two play-off final on 26 May where they met and defeated northwest rivals Rochdale 3–2.

Luton Town (loan)
Logan joined Luton Town on loan for six months in the 2008–09 season, providing competition for Luton goalkeeper Dean Brill. He saved three penalty kicks in a 0–0 FA Cup draw against Altrincham on 21 November 2008, which Luton won 4–2 on penalties. Logan helped the club to another penalty shootout win against Brentford in the Football League Trophy second round on 7 October 2008. His form prompted the club to make an offer for his loan to be extended by a further month. However, this was rejected by Logan's agent, and he missed out on the 2009 Football League Trophy Final against Scunthorpe on 5 April 2009, which Luton won 3–2.

Stockport County (second loan)
On 27 March, Logan rejoined Stockport County on a one-week emergency loan as cover for injured keepers Owain Fôn Williams and Lloyd Rigby. He extended his stay with Stockport by a further week on 3 April in where the club's win against Crewe on the penultimate game guaranteed safety in League One.

Return to Leicester City
Despite a succession of loan moves, Logan refused to give up on his career at Leicester and vowed to fight for his place in the 2009–10 season. Tim Flowers, who was previously coach at the club, felt that "to be fair to Conrad, he has also done well." Logan signed an extended contract with Leicester until the summer of 2012 on 16 February 2010. He finally played his first league game for the club since 2007 against Sheffield Wednesday at Hillsborough Stadium on 6 March 2010, conceding one goal in a 2–0 defeat. Coming on as a substitute for injured first choice keeper Chris Weale, Logan was still happy with life at the club. With Leicester already qualified for the Championship play-offs, Logan was finally given his first start against Middlesbrough on 2 May 2010, saving a penalty kick and keeping a clean sheet in a 2–0 win.

Bristol Rovers (loan)
Logan played seven games for Leicester in 2010–11 season, before on 18 February 2011, he joined Bristol Rovers on a one-month loan deal. Logan then extended his loan deal until the end of the season, after impressive displays, including two penalty saves in as many games against Huddersfield and Notts County. Towards the end of his 16 games at Bristol Logan expressed his desire to stay at Rovers permanently, a move that failed to materialise.

Rotherham United (loan)
On 5 August, Logan joined Rotherham United on loan until January 2012. Logan made his debut for the Millers in the 1–0 win over Oxford United on 7 August. At the end of his loan, Logan returned to Leicester amidst rumours about a permanent move away from Leicester.

Second return to Leicester City
On 29 June 2012, Logan signed a new deal extending his stay at the King Power Stadium until June 2013. Logan was an unused substitute in every one of Leicester's league and cup games that season and did not play a competitive match. Despite this, he was a regular for the club's Development Squad, captaining the side on many occasions as they won promotion to the newly formed Barclays Under 21 Premier League.  At the end of May 2013, Leicester City announced, whilst publishing their release list for out of contract players, that negotiations were taking place for Logan to remain at the club for another season. On 13 June, Logan signed a new two-year contract until 2015. On 27 August 2013, he made his first appearance for Leicester City since October 2010, playing the full 90 minutes of the club's 5–2 League Cup win over Carlisle United.

Rochdale (loan)
On 18 August 2014, Logan joined League One side Rochdale on an initial one-month loan, following an injury to Josh Lillis. Logan made his debut in Rochdale's 5–2 victory at Crewe Alexandra, putting in an impressive display. On 28 August, Logan extended his loan at the club until January. Logan saved a penalty in Rochdale's 3–2 victory over Leyton Orient on 27 September, a feat he would replicate in the next game, saving Conor Hourihane's last minute penalty, although it couldn't prevent a 1–0 loss to Barnsley. On 20 December, Logan fell awkwardly during a match against Notts County and later had to be substituted. Following the match, manager Keith Hill confirmed that Logan had suffered a 'serious' injury and Logan himself later tweeted that his loan spell had ended due to the injury. He made 24 appearances for Rochdale in all competitions that season, as they finished a very credible 8th place, their highest-ever league placing.

Hibernian
Logan signed a short-term contract with Scottish club Hibernian in March 2016. In his first senior game for sixteen months, he was man of the match in Hibernian's Scottish Cup semi-final win against Dundee United. Logan made a series of saves during the match, which finished goalless, then made two saves in the penalty shootout. Despite this performance, manager Alan Stubbs opted to restore regular goalkeeper Mark Oxley to the starting lineup for the following match. Logan regained the starting place before the promotion playoffs, in which Hibs lost to Falkirk 5–4 on aggregate. He then started the 2016 Scottish Cup Final, which Hibs won 3–2 against Rangers. Logan left Hibernian at the end of his contract after making eight appearances for the club.

Return to Rochdale
On 10 August 2016, Logan joined EFL League One side Rochdale on a six-month contract. He made 11 appearances in those six months prior to signing an extension until the end of the 2016–17 season.

Mansfield Town
Logan joined Mansfield Town on 10 May 2017. He was released by Mansfield at the end of the 2019–20 season.

Forest Green Rovers (loan)
On 24 January 2020, Logan joined Forest Green Rovers on loan until the end of the season.

Anstey Nomads, Stamford AFC and return to Anstey Nomads
In November 2020, Logan turned down offers to return to The Football League and officially committed to United Counties League Premier Division club Anstey Nomads as a player, but also as a coach with the club's junior team and as a guide to the club's other coaches.

In January 2021, Logan signed for non-league side Stamford AFC. However, he returned to Anstey Nomads six months later.

International career
Logan was capped by the Republic of Ireland at youth international levels from under-14 to under-19.

Career statistics

Honours
Hibernian
Scottish Cup: 2015–16

Stockport County
Football League Two play-offs: 2008

References

External links

1986 births
Living people
People educated at St Eunan's College
People from Letterkenny
Association football coaches
Association footballers from County Donegal
Association football goalkeepers
Republic of Ireland association footballers
Republic of Ireland expatriate association footballers
Republic of Ireland youth international footballers
Expatriate footballers in England
Swilly Rovers F.C. players
Leicester City F.C. players
Luton Town F.C. players
Boston United F.C. players
Stockport County F.C. players
Bristol Rovers F.C. players
Rotherham United F.C. players
Rochdale A.F.C. players
English Football League players
Hibernian F.C. players
Mansfield Town F.C. players
Scottish Professional Football League players
Forest Green Rovers F.C. players
Anstey Nomads F.C. players